The 2004–05 Croatian Football Cup was the fourteenth season of Croatia's football knockout competition.

Calendar

Preliminary round
The preliminary round was held on 7 September 2004.

First round
First round was held on 21 and 22 September 2004.

Second round
Second round was held between 12 and 27 October 2004.

Quarter-finals
First legs were held between 8 and 15 March and second legs between 15 and 31 March 2005.

|}

Semi-finals

First legs

Second legs

Rijeka won 6–4 on aggregate.

Hajduk Split won 3–2 on aggregate.

Final

First leg

Second leg

Rijeka won 3–1 on aggregate.

See also
2004–05 Croatian First Football League
2004–05 Croatian Second Football League

External links
Official website 

Croatian Football Cup seasons
Croatian Cup, 2004-05
Croatian Cup, 2004-05